There are nineteen known ruined churches on the Swedish island of Gotland, twelve of which lie in Visby, the island's main town. Of these, ten lie within the medieval city walls. Three additional church ruins in Visby are known through written sources, but today completely vanished.

Gotland began to gradually abandon Norse religion and adopt Christianity during the 11th century. While the earliest churches were wooden, construction of stone churches began during the 12th century. The church building period was fairly short; in the countryside stone churches were erected between the early 12th and mid-14th centuries, while in Visby the last churches were inaugurated during the 15th century.

Some of these churches have since fallen into ruin. Of the 94 medieval parish churches in the countryside, 91 are still in use. Three were abandoned following the Reformation, when parishes were merged, and some churches became superfluous. There are in addition three chapel ruins, or ruins of small churches, in the countryside. There are also the ruins of two Cistercian abbeys, one in the countryside and one just outside the city wall of Visby.

Although the exact number of churches that existed in Visby during the Middle Ages is unknown, there were certainly more than in any other Swedish city, and at least twelve within the city walls. Visby grew to become an important trading port during the Middle Ages, and most of the churches in the city were built during the 12th and 13th centuries. The churches were not, as in the countryside, only parish churches. Some belonged to abbeys, almshouses or served groups of traders of a specific nationality, such as the Russian Church or present-day Visby Cathedral, which was originally a church used by German traders.

Following the Black Death, the invasion of Gotland by Valdemar IV of Denmark and the Battle of Visby in 1361, and a general decrease in trade, Gotland entered a period of decline. From about 1361, building activity therefore dropped. The inauguration of Sankta Karin in 1412 marks the end of church building activity in Visby. When troops from Lübeck pillaged the city in 1525, and probably damaged several of the churches, the social and economic rationale for sustaining them had vanished. With the advent of the Reformation soon afterwards, the religious rationale to sustain the upkeep of the many churches also permanently disappeared. All monasteries were abolished and all churches within the city walls except one (present-day Visby Cathedral) were abandoned and left to decay. During the following centuries, some church ruins were used as quarries. In 1805 the church ruins were protected by law and in 1863 the Swedish state for the first time allocated money for their conservation.

List

See also
 List of medieval churches on Gotland

References

Further reading

External links 

Sweden religion-related lists
Gotland

Gotland
Featured lists